Charles Harding Divine (January 20, 1889 – May 8, 1950) was an American poet and playwright. He was a soldier in the First World War, and his first book of poems in 1918 was praised by reviewers, one of whom said he was one of the most important American poets of the day.

Life
Divine was born in Binghamton, New York (January 20, 1889) and graduated from Cornell University in 1911, where he worked for The Cornell Daily Sun and was a member of the Quill and Dagger society. He worked as a reporter for the New York Sun until 1916, when he became a full-time writer. In 1917 he enlisted (having been rejected at first for being underweight) and fought in France in the 27th Division. Following the war he published books of poems and plays up to 1936, when he took up farming. Subsequently he was a Senior Instructor in English in Triple Cities College, Endicott, until 1948. He adapted two of his short plays for comedy films. His novel Cognac Hill was about love on the Western Front. In addition to his books he published more than 100 short stories. Some of his poems were reprinted in magazines during the Second World War and a line from one of them, At the Lavender Lantern (referring to a café in Greenwich Village), inspired the name of a book Onions in the Stew.  He died May 8, 1950 in Bay Pines, Florida.

Publications

Poetry
City Ways and Company Streets (1918) Moffat, Yard & Co.
Gypsy Gold (1923) T. Seltzer
The Road to Town: A Book of Poems (1925) T. Seltzer

Plays
Post Mortems: A Comedy of the Bridge Table (1926) D. Appleton & Co.
Pirtle Drums it in (1926) D. Appleton & Co.
Love in an Attic: A Play in One Act (1928) S. French Ltd
Mr. Utley's Etiquette: A Comedy in One Act (1928) S. French Ltd
Strangers at Home: A Play in Three Acts (1935) S. French Ltd
Appetite for Adventure: A Comedy in One Act (1936) S. French Ltd

Novel
Cognac Hill (1927) Payson & Clarke Ltd

Films
Post Mortems (1929)

References

1889 births
1950 deaths
20th-century American poets
American male dramatists and playwrights
American male poets
Cornell University alumni
20th-century American male writers